This is the discography of Haitian–American producer, musician and songwriter Jerry "Wonda" Duplessis. Releases by The Fugees are listed on their article page.

Albums

Studio albums

Compilation albums

EPs

References

Discographies of American artists